Café de Paris is a 1938 French mystery film directed by Yves Mirande and Georges Lacombe.

Cast 
 Véra Korène - Geneviève Lambert
 Jules Berry - Fleury
 Simone Berriau - Odette
 Jacques Baumer - Le commissaire de police
 Pierre Brasseur - Le Rec
 Julien Carette - Le journaliste 
 Florence Marly - Estelle
  - La dame des lavabos
  - Mlle Aurillac
 Marcel Vallée - Le chef de la sureté
 Maurice Escande - Le marquis de Perelli
 Jacques Grétillat - Lambert 
 André Roanne - Mouvance

References

External links 

1938 mystery films
1938 films
French mystery films
French black-and-white films
Films directed by Yves Mirande
Films directed by Georges Lacombe
1930s French films